Grand Forks County is a county in the U.S. state of North Dakota. As of the 2020 census, its population was 73,170, making it the third-most populous county in North Dakota. Its county seat and largest community is Grand Forks.

History
Using territory annexed from Pembina County, the Dakota Territory legislature created Grand Forks County on January 4, 1873. Its governing structure was not established at that time, nor was the territory attached to another county for administrative and judicial purposes. The government was organized on March 2, 1875.

The county's boundaries were altered in 1875, 1881, and 1883. It has retained its present boundary since 1883.

Grand Forks County is included in the Grand Forks, ND-MN Metropolitan Statistical Area.

Geography
Grand Forks County lies on the east side of North Dakota. Its east boundary line abuts the west boundary line of the state of Minnesota (across the Red River). The Red River flows northward along the county's east border, on its way to Lake Winnipeg and Hudson Bay. The Forest River flows easterly and northerly across the upper western part of the county.

The terrain of Grand Forks County consists of low rolling hills, devoted to agriculture except around urban areas. The terrain slopes to the north and east; its highest point is a hill at its southwestern corner, at 1,450' (457m) ASL.

The University of North Dakota has established a Field Biology Station on Forest River, at the county's northern border. In 2013 it partnered with ND Game & Fish Department to establish a 160-acre (0.65 km2) wildlife management area at the station, to monitor whitetail deer activity in the forest. The field station is tasked with identifying plants native and endemic to the area. A total of 498 plants have been collected at the Forest River Biology Station and Wildlife Management Area.

Major highways

  Interstate 29
  U.S. Highway 2
  U.S. Highway 81
  North Dakota Highway 15
  North Dakota Highway 18
  North Dakota Highway 32

Adjacent counties

 Walsh County - north
 Marshall County, Minnesota - northeast
 Polk County, Minnesota - east
 Traill County - southeast
 Steele County - southwest
 Nelson County - west

Protected areas

 Forest River Biology Station/Wildlife Management Area
 Grand Forks County Larimore Dam Recreation Area
 Kellys Slough National Wildlife Refuge
 Little Goose National Wildlife Refuge
 Prairie Chicken State Game Management Area
 Turtle River State Park

Lakes
 Fordville Dam
 Larimore Dam
 Smith Lakes

Demographics

2000 census
As of the 2000 census, there were 66,109 people, 25,435 households, and 15,617 families in the county. There were 27,373 housing units at an average density of 19 per square mile (7/km2). The racial makeup of the county was 93.00% White, 1.37% Black or African American, 2.31% Native American, 0.98% Asian, 0.07% Pacific Islander, 0.72% from other races, and 1.57% from two or more races. 2.06% of the population were Hispanic or Latino of any race. 31.6% were of Norwegian, 26.1% German and 5.5% Irish ancestry.

There were 25,435 households, out of which 32.4% had children under the age of 18 living with them, 49.5% were married couples living together, 8.8% had a female householder with no husband present, and 38.6% were non-families. 28.3% of all households were made up of individuals, and 8.2% had someone living alone who was 65 years of age or older. The average household size was 2.43 and the average family size was 3.03.

The county population contained 23.8% under the age of 18, 19.6% from 18 to 24, 28.8% from 25 to 44, 18.2% from 45 to 64, and 9.6% who were 65 years of age or older.  The median age was 29 years. For every 100 females, there were 103.7 males. For every 100 females age 18 and over, there were 102.3 males.

The median income for a household in the county was $35,785, and the median income for a family was $46,620. Males had a median income of $30,079 versus $21,426 for females. The per capita income for the county was $17,868. About 8.0% of families and 12.3% of the population were below the poverty line, including 12.0% of those under age 18 and 7.6% of those age 65 or over.

2010 census
As of the 2010 census, there were 66,861 people, 27,417 households, and 15,215 families in the county. The racial makeup of the county was 90.3% white, 2.5% American Indian, 2.0% black or African American, 1.9% Asian, 0.1% Pacific islander, 0.8% from other races, and 2.4% from two or more races. Those of Hispanic or Latino origin made up 2.9% of the population. In terms of ancestry, 34.1% were German, 33.8% were Norwegian, 9.5% were Irish, 5.8% were Polish, 5.3% were English, and 2.9% were American.

Of the 27,417 households, 26.6% had children under the age of 18 living with them, 42.8% were married couples living together, 9.1% had a female householder with no husband present, 44.5% were non-families, and 32.1% of all households were made up of individuals. The average household size was 2.28 and the average family size was 2.91. The median age was 29.7 years.

The median income for a household in the county was $44,242 and the median income for a family was $65,804. Males had a median income of $40,622 versus $31,633 for females. The per capita income for the county was $24,276. About 8.2% of families and 17.5% of the population were below the poverty line, including 15.6% of those under age 18 and 10.3% of those age 65 or over.

Population by decade

Communities

Cities

 Emerado
 Gilby
 Grand Forks (county seat)
 Inkster
 Larimore
 Manvel
 Niagara
 Northwood
 Reynolds (part)
 Thompson

Census-designated places
 Grand Forks AFB

Other communities

 Arvilla
 Belleville
 Emerado
 Forest River Colony
 Hannah Junction
 Johnstown
 Kempton
 Logan Center
 McCanna
 Mekinock

Townships

 Agnes
 Allendale
 Americus
 Arvilla
 Avon
 Bentru
 Blooming
 Brenna
 Chester
 Elkmount
 Elm Grove
 Fairfield
 Falconer
 Ferry
 Gilby
 Grace
 Grand Forks
 Hegton
 Inkster
 Johnstown
 Lakeville
 Larimore
 Levant
 Lind
 Logan Center
 Loretta
 Mekinock
 Michigan
 Moraine
 Niagara
 Northwood
 Oakville
 Pleasant View
 Plymouth
 Rye
 Strabane
 Turtle River
 Union
 Walle
 Washington
 Wheatfield

Politics
Grand Forks County voters historically vote Republican. In only one national election since 1964 has the county selected the Democratic Party candidate.

See also
 National Register of Historic Places listings in Grand Forks County, North Dakota

References

External links
 Grand Forks County maps, Sheet 1 (northern) and Sheet 2 (southern), North Dakota DOT

 
Greater Grand Forks
1875 establishments in Dakota Territory
Populated places established in 1875